The Gordon Hunter Memorial Trophy is a Rugby Union trophy contested between the Blues and Highlanders as a part of some regular season Super Rugby fixtures between the two sides. The trophy is awarded in memory of Gordon Hunter, who had been head coach of both teams prior to his passing in 2002. Prior to 2013, the trophy was contested every time the two teams met, but with the introduction of the conference system meaning there are two meetings per regular season, the decision was made that the trophy would only be contested in matches hosted by the holders. The Blues currently hold the trophy, since earning it in 2020's Super Rugby Aotearoa. While the Blues scored non-trophy-match wins over the Highlanders in the 2013 and 2014 seasons, the Highlanders won both home and away in 2015 on their way to lifting the Super Rugby title.

Past winners
The following table summarises the results between the two sides since the trophy was first contested in 2002.
2016 was the first season in which the Gordon Hunter Memorial Trophy could not be contested due to the Blues only playing the Highlanders once - not in the host city of the current holders.

The next contest for the trophy will take place in the 2023 Super Rugby season in Auckland. Both teams have held the trophy 11 times with the Blues the current holders.

References

Rugby union competitions in New Zealand
Super Rugby
Rugby union trophies and awards